Young Legs is an American folk musician from New Jersey.

History 
Young Legs is an indie folk musician and the artistic moniker of Steven Donahue, a multi-instrumentalist from Bloomfield, New Jersey. Jersey Beat columnist Deborah Draisin describes his music as "innocent, free and intricate".  In 2010, he recorded an album in his parents' basement titled The Fog and The Forest, which Donahue explains as "the story of a disenchanted lover who permanently finds solace in a misty wood." Mint 400 Records signed Young Legs in 2015.

Mint 400 Records 

In 2015, Mint 400 Records released the single "Resolution".  The twelve-track album Promise of Winter was released on May 19, 2015, which ranges from whispery folk to brash indie-rock. He performed at the 2016 North Jersey Indie Rock Festival. On November 4, 2016, Young Legs released the single "Ring of Salt," 

The Petal and the Page album was released on December 9, 2016.

Additional work 
Young Legs appears on the Fairmont album A Spring Widow, sharing vocals with Neil Sabatino on the song "Box of Crickets".  He also performs on  the album Fabricated by Defend the Rhino."

Donahue plays bass guitar and provides backing vocals for The Big Drops. He also plays bass guitar for Trim Tabs, along with Justin Grabosky on vocals and guitar, Ezra Lowrey on keys and Michael Matrisciano on drums.

Discography 

Albums
The Fog and The Forest (2010)
Promise of Winter (2015)
The Petal and the Page (2016)
Songs From Lost Valley (2020)

Singles
"Resolution" (2015)
"Ring of Salt" (2016)

Appearing on
In a Mellow Tone (2015)
Mint 400 Records Presents Nirvana In Utero (2017)
A Spring Widow by Fairmont (2017)
Fabricated by Defend The Rhino (2018)
At the Movies (2018)
NJ / NY Mixtape (2018)

References 

Citations

Bibliography

External links 

American male singers
Songwriters from New Jersey
Living people
Mint 400 Records artists
Musicians from New Jersey
Year of birth missing (living people)
American male songwriters